Noun is the solo musical project of Screaming Females lead guitar player Marissa Paternoster. Paternoster started recording as Noun in 2004 and had a track featured on the I Heard This First CD compilation, her first release was a 2009 self-released cassette called Forgotten Grin compiling 5 years' worth of material, reissued on Don Giovanni Records in 2013.  Noun's first full length, Holy Hell was released in 2010 by Don Giovanni Records.   

In a 2012 list Marissa Paternoster was named the 77th-greatest guitarist of all time by SPIN magazine.

Discography

Full-length records

EPs

External links
 Don Giovanni Records Official Website

References

Don Giovanni Records artists
Musical groups established in 2004
Musical groups from New Jersey
State Champion Records artists